Frederick Robert Buckley (1896–1976), better known as F.  R. Buckley,  was an English writer. He wrote more than 200 short stories for pulp magazines between 1918 and 1953. He was born on 20 December 1896 in Colton, Staffordshire, England, and died in 1976. He was the son of R. J. Buckley (1847–1938) and Mary Wakelin. His father was music critic for the Birmingham Gazette from 1886–1926. Frederick attended King Edward's School, Birmingham and Birmingham University, studying journalism. While at King Edward's School, at age 14, he performed in Aristophanes' Peace in the role of Theoria.  Also in the cast was schoolmate J. R. R. Tolkien playing Hermes.  F. R. Buckley was married in 1916 to actress Helen Curry and his brother-in-law was fellow pulp fiction author Tom Curry.

Silent film era

In 1915, Buckley emigrated to the United States on the SS St Louis and worked as Chief reviewer and later Editor for the Motion Picture Mail, a Saturday magazine supplement of the New York Evening Mail. Buckley then moved to become New York Managing Editor of the Exhibitors Herald.  Starting in 1917, he worked in silent film in Brooklyn for the Vitagraph Studios where he was primarily a screenwriter and occasionally an actor. Between 1917 ands 1918 he wrote, co-wrote or adapted the scenarios for The Cambric Mask, By the World Forgot,  A Gentleman's Agreement, The Purple Dress, Lost on Dress Parade, The Song of the Soul, The Other Man, The Hiding of Black Bill, A Night in New Arabia, The Last of the Troubadours and The Lovers' Knot.  He appeared in principal roles in The Undercurrent and The Unknown Quantity.

Writer

Buckley left Vitagraph after selling Getting It, his first short story to The Black Cat, an American magazine specializing in original short stories of an unusual nature for $20.00.

O.Henry Award
In 1922 Buckley won the O' Henry Prize for his short story Gold-Mounted Guns published in Red Book Magazine, March 1922.  His story Habit, honorably mentioned in the O'Henry Memorial Volume for 1923. and published in the April 30, 1923 issue of Adventure was adapted for the July 18, 1948 episode of the CBS radio program Escape.

Pulps, Slicks and Novels
Buckley's fiction also appeared in Collier's, Liberty, McClure's, Ellery Queen's Mystery Magazine,  and The Saturday Evening Post. He was also extensively published in many pulp magazines including Adventure, Hutchinson's Adventure-story Magazine, Argosy, The Blue Book Magazine,  Short Stories , The Story-Teller and Western Story Magazine. For Adventure,
Buckley wrote a series of  stories set in the Italian Renaissance, revolving around the swashbuckling exploits of condottieri Captain Luigi Caradosso. The Luigi Caradosso stories were enormously popular with Adventure's readers. When Adventure published a new Caradosso story  in the May 1940 issue (after a six-year hiatus), the editor Howard Bloomfield noted that many readers had written in to request that the magazine "Bring back Captain Caradosso." Buckley also wrote a novel, The Way of Sinners, set in sixteenth-century Italy, in which Caradosso is mentioned.  Buckley also published Western, mystery and sea stories as well as historical fiction. 
Later some of his short stories would be adapted for film or radio by others. The Bearcat, a 1922 Universal Film Manufacturing Company picture, Peg Leg and the Kidnapper, originally published in Western Story Magazine was used for the 1926 Fox Film Corporation film The Gentle Cyclone and RKO Radio Pictures Stung 1931.

Return to Journalism
In the 1930s Buckley returned to England writing film criticism again, now for the Birmingham Evening Despatch.

Broadcaster

He was a writer and on-air radio presenter on the BBC from 1934 to 1970.

Sometime between 1947 and 1951, Buckley is credited with bringing actor and comedian Stanley Unwin to the attention of BBC producers Peter Cairns and David Martin, who premiered Unwin's first broadcast on the radio programme Pat Dixon's Mirror of the Month In the mid 1950s, Buckley worked as a portrait painter in Paris.

From 1959 to 1962, Buckley was heard as a regular panellist on the weekly BBC radio programme The Guilty Party, wherein a crime play was dramatised, after which the panellists would cross-examine the characters in an effort to figure out who was guilty of the crime.

Historic Homes

National Heritage List for England

From the 1960s to the time of his death in 1976, Buckley lived in a reportedly haunted (though not very enthusiastically, according to Buckley) listed building on the National Heritage List for England in King's Lynn, Norfolk, England, which is known as The Exorcist's house.

Connecticut State Register
Buckley's former home (1920-1932) in Norwalk, Connecticut is listed with the Connecticut State Historic Preservation Office on the Connecticut State Register of Historic Places.

Books by F. R. Buckley

1923 – Canyon of Green Death
1925 – Joan Of The Ranch
1925 – The Sage Hen 
1926 – Billy Van
1926 – The Blithe Sheriff
1927 – The Way of Sinners – In this gory tale of Renaissance Italy, Francesco Vitali, Captain of a formidable band of mercenaries, tells his life story.
1927 – Re-enter the Blithe Sheriff
1944 – Davey Jones, I Love You

References

External links 

F. R. Buckley "Motion Picture Studio Director and Trade Annual 1920"
 
"F. R. Buckley", BBC Genome - Radio Times 1923 - 2009
A Celebration of Midsummer, 1966 – East Anglian Film Archives
On Camera: The Stansfield Horror, 1972 – East Anglian Film Archives
F. R. Buckley, The Author and the Draft: Is Writing Useful?, The Authors League Bulletin, January 1918, Vol. V, No. 10 p. 8
F. R. Buckley works at the Internet Archive

1896 births
1976 deaths
20th-century American male actors
20th-century American male writers
20th-century American novelists
20th-century English novelists
American film critics
American male film actors
American male screenwriters
American male short story writers
American male silent film actors
American male novelists
American male journalists
American mystery writers
American short story writers
English film critics
English radio presenters
English mystery writers
English crime fiction writers
English historical novelists
English male journalists
Male screenwriters
Pulp fiction writers
People educated at King Edward's School, Birmingham
People from Colton, Staffordshire
Writers from King's Lynn
Western (genre) writers
Writers from Norwalk, Connecticut
Writers of historical fiction set in the early modern period
20th-century American screenwriters